Styles Bluff is a light-colored rock bluff at the southeast side of Edward VIII Plateau, rising out of the sea 1 nautical mile (1.9 km) north of Cape Gotley. Mapped by Norwegian cartographers from aerial photos taken by the Lars Christensen Expedition, 1936–37. First visited in February 1960 by an ANARE (Australian National Antarctic Research Expeditions) party led by D.F. Styles, Asst. Director, Antarctic Division, Melbourne, for whom this feature was named.

References

Cliffs of Antarctica
Landforms of Kemp Land